Engagement at Wolfgangsee (German: Verlobung am Wolfgangsee) is a 1956 Austrian comedy film directed by Helmut Weiss and starring Ingrid Andree, Wolf Albach-Retty and Maria Andergast. The film was shot in Agfacolor at the Schönbrunn Studios in Vienna and on location around Lake Wolfgang. The film's sets were designed by the art director Wolf Witzemann. It is a remake of the 1943 film Sophienlund which was itself based on a 1941 play of the same title which Weiss co-authored. It was part of a large number of heimatfilm made in Germany and Austria during the decade.

Synopsis
When the Eckberg family gathers at their home by Lake Wolfgang, their father reveals to them that their relationships to each other are different to what they had been brought up to believe.

Cast
 Ingrid Andree as Gabriele
 Wolf Albach-Retty as Erich Eckberg
 Maria Andergast as Sigrid Eckberg
 Michael Cramer as 	Knut
 Michael Heltau as Michael
 Sylvia Lund as 	Barbara Cleving
 Melanie Horeschowsky as Selma
 Chris Howland as Junger Engländer

References

Bibliography 
 Von Dassanowsky, Robert . Austrian Cinema. McFarland & Co, 2005.

External links 
 

1956 films
Austrian comedy films
1956 comedy films
1950s German-language films
Films directed by Helmut Weiss
Films shot at Schönbrunn Studios
Austrian films based on plays
Remakes of German films